Insert Subscriber Data is a Subscriber Data Handling procedure in LTE services. This procedure is used to manage the subscription data of subscriber in MME and SGSN over S6a/S6d interface. IDR is invoked by Home Subscriber Server for subscription data handling. 
IDR is MAP subscriber management service utilized in GSM/UMTS networks, standardized by 3GPP, and defined in the MAP specification, TS 29.002.  This service is used to provide specific subscriber data in the following environments: by an HLR to update a VLR, by an HLR to update a SGSN, and by an HSS to update a MME via IWF in an EPS.  This service is primarily used by the home subscriber management entity to update the serving subscriber management entity when there is either a change in a subscriber parameter, or upon a location updating of the subscriber.

Parameters
As of specification released December 2008, the following parameters are supported by the Insert Subscriber Data service:
Invoke Id
IMSI
MSISDN
Category
Subscriber Status
Bearer service List
Teleservice List
Forwarding information List
Call barring information List
CUG information List
SS-Data List
eMLPP Subscription Data
MC-Subscription Data
Operator Determined Barring General data
Operator Determined Barring HPLMN data
Roaming Restriction Due To Unsupported Feature
Regional Subscription Data
VLR CAMEL Subscription Info
Voice Broadcast Data
Voice Group Call Data
Network access mode
GPRS Subscription Data
EPS Subscription Data
Roaming Restricted In SGSN/MME Due To Unsupported Feature
North American Equal Access preferred Carrier Id List
SGSN CAMEL Subscription Info
LSA Information
IST Alert Timer
SS-Code List
LMU Identifier
LCS Information
CS Allocation/Retention priority
Super-Charger Supported In HLR
Subscribed Charging Characteristics
Access Restriction Data
ICS Indicator
CSG Subscription Data
Regional Subscription Response
Supported CAMEL Phases
Offered CAMEL 4 CSIs
Supported Features

References

3GPP standards